Roy A. Sommer (born April 5, 1957) is an American former professional ice hockey player who is currently serving as the head coach of the San Diego Gulls of the American Hockey League (AHL). Sommer played three games for the Edmonton Oilers of the National Hockey League during the 1980–81 season, before spending the rest of his playing career, which lasted from 1977 to 1987, in the minor leagues. He was the head coach of the American Hockey League's San Jose Barracuda from 1998 to 2019 and 2020 to 2022. The Barracuda, the AHL affiliate of the San Jose Sharks, have also been known as the Kentucky Thoroughblades, Cleveland Barons, Worcester Sharks throughout his tenure. He was the longest tenured head coach with the same organization in the AHL and has the most AHL wins as head coach.

Sommer grew up in the San Francisco area where he played youth hockey for Skyline High School before moving to Calgary at age 17.

Coaching career
On November 1, 2009, while with the Worcester Sharks, Sommer became just the fourth head coach in AHL history to reach 400 wins.

On February 10, 2016, while with the San Jose Barracuda, Sommer became the winningest head coach in AHL history when he reached 637 wins. He surpassed Bun Cook, who spent 19 seasons as a head coach in the AHL. He won the Louis A. R. Pieri Memorial Award as the AHL's coach of the year in 2017 after leading the Barracuda to the best regular season finish in the AHL's Pacific Division.

On December 11, 2019, after the NHL San Jose Sharks fired head coach Peter DeBoer and his staff, Sommer left the San Jose Barracuda to serve as the Sharks associate coach under interim head coach Bob Boughner. After working the final 37 games of the 2019–20 NHL season with the Sharks, Sommer returned to the Barracuda on September 22, 2020.

Sommer won his 800th game as a head coach on January 8, 2022 against the Henderson Silver Knights. On May 18, he transitioned to a senior advisory role within the team as assistant John McCarthy was named his successor. In 24 seasons with the Sharks organization, he recorded 808 wins against 721 losses, 48 ties, and 159 overtime defeats.

Personal life
Sommer and his wife, Melissa, have three children together: son Marley, who has Down syndrome, son Castan, who coaches men’s ice hockey at College of the Holy Cross, and daughter Kira.

Career statistics

Regular season and playoffs

International

References

External links

1957 births
Living people
American men's ice hockey left wingers
Calgary Centennials players
Edmonton Oil Kings (WCHL) players
Edmonton Oilers players
Grand Rapids Owls players
Houston Apollos players
Ice hockey people from California
Ice hockey players from California
Indianapolis Checkers players
Maine Mariners players
Muskegon Lumberjacks players
Saginaw Gears players
San Jose Sharks coaches
Spokane Flyers (PHL) players
Sportspeople from Oakland, California
Spruce Grove Mets players
Toronto Maple Leafs draft picks
Wichita Wind players